The 1990 Paisley North by-election was a parliamentary by-election held on 29 November 1990 for the House of Commons constituency of Paisley North, in the town of Paisley, Scotland.

It was caused by the death of the sitting Member of Parliament for the constituency, Allen Adams. The Scottish National Party saw a healthy increase in their share of the vote, but not enough to win, and the Labour Party retained the seat, with Adams' widow Irene being elected.

Results

See also
 Elections in Scotland
 List of United Kingdom by-elections

References

1990 in Scotland
1990s elections in Scotland
Politics of Paisley, Renfrewshire
1990 elections in the United Kingdom
By-elections to the Parliament of the United Kingdom in Scottish constituencies